Greg Nixon (born September 12, 1981) is an American sprinter who specialises in the 400 meters. His success has come mostly in the 400m and 4×400-meter relay, he is a 3x World Champion and a 2x USA Champion.

His first major medal came at the Athletics at the 2007 Pan American Games, where he led off the American relay team to win a silver medal. At the 2008 IAAF World Indoor Championships, Nixon finished third in his 400 m heat with a time of 47.64.  He also won a gold medal in the 4 × 400 m relay.

At the 2010 IAAF World Indoor Championships, Nixon won a second gold medal in the 4 × 400 m relay. He ran a 400 m personal best of 44.61 seconds winning his second USA 400m title at the 2010 USA Championships, out of lane 8.

At the 2011 USA Championships, Nixon reached the podium again to make the 2011 World Champion team. He went on to win another gold medal for team USA.

References

External links 
 
 

1981 births
American male sprinters
Living people
World Athletics Championships medalists
Pan American Games medalists in athletics (track and field)
Pan American Games silver medalists for the United States
Athletes (track and field) at the 2007 Pan American Games
USA Outdoor Track and Field Championships winners
USA Indoor Track and Field Championships winners
World Athletics Indoor Championships winners
IAAF Continental Cup winners
World Athletics Championships winners
Medalists at the 2007 Pan American Games